Meir Ya'ari (24 April 1897 – 21 February 1987) was an Israeli politician, educator, and social activist. He was the leader of Hashomer Hatzair, Kibbutz Artzi, and Mapam, and a member of the Knesset.

Biography
Meyer Wald (later Ya'ari) was born in Kańczuga in the Galicia area of Austria-Hungary in 1897. At the outbreak of World War I his family moved to Vienna. At the age of 17 he volunteered for the Austrian Army and served as an officer until the end of the war. He studied at the Agricultural Academy and at the University of Vienna. In 1919 he co-founded and co-led the Viennese Hashomer Hatzair. In 1920, he made aliyah to Palestine. He worked at the Kinneret moshava, and in the Gdud HaAvoda group, paving roads from Tiberias to Tzemah and to Tabgha. 

His grandson, Yedidya Ya'ari, is a retired Israel Defense Forces general.

Zionist activism

Ya'ari was one of the founders of Bitania, the first collective settlement of Hashomer Hatzair. He was among the founders of the Histadrut workers' syndicate. From 1924 onwards he served as Secretary of the world Hashomer Hatzair.

In 1927, he founded Kibbutz Artzi, was elected its secretary and took part in drafting its principles. In 1929, he was among the founders of Kibbutz Merhavia, where he lived until he died.

Political career
In 1948, he co-founded Mapam political party as its leader, and functioned as its general secretary until 1973. He was a Mapam MK in the first through seventh Knessets, from 1949 to 1973. In the first Knesset he was member of the Knesset committee, and in the fifth through seventh Knessets he was member of Foreign Affairs and Defense Committee.

His movement co-leader and almost equal colleague was Yaakov Hazan. For many years, they led Hashomer Hatzair and Mapam together. Despite holding the top two positions in Mapam's list, they made a joint decision not to become ministers but rather occupy themselves in the movement's ideological and educational activities.

Views and opinions
As leader and ideologist of Hashomer Hatzair, he sought to turn it from a scout-like youth movement promoting abstract socialist-humanist ideas to a political settlement movement that integrates Zionism and Marxism.

He protested David Ben-Gurion's activism and Mapai's moderate socialism. He regarded highly the achievements of Revolutionary Socialism in the Soviet Union, although he criticized its attitude towards Zionism. In the 1940s he opposed the Biltmore Program and supported the one-state solution.

During Israel's early years, he objected his party's coalition membership and was an outspoken critic of the government's western orientation, the nationality conception, the Reparations Agreement and the martial law. At first, he supported the Soviet Union and tried, along with Moshe Sneh, to introduce Hashomer Hatzair's idea in Mapam. The exposure of Stalin's wrongdoings caused a schism in the Marxist orientation, resulting in the expulsion of Moshe Sneh's men from the party in 1953. Gradually, admiration of the Soviet Union lessened and inclination to cooperate with Mapai increased, and in 1955 Mapam indeed joined Mapai in the coalition. After the Six-Day War he expressed a relatively hawkish stand by opposing immediate withdrawal from the occupied territories. In 1969 he supported Mapam's alliance with Mapai as part of the Alignment; in 1984, he would support staying in the Alignment until the formation of the national unity government in 1984.

Political legacy
To his honor, the Association for Progressive Education in Honor of Meir Ya'ari (YAARI) was founded. Over the past decades YAARI envisioned, designed and implemented many peace-building projects in the region and especially in Cyprus. YAARI has also implemented a large-scale EC supported project known as Act Beyond Borders, which promoted reconciliation between Israelis and Palestinians through education.

References

External links

The Birth of Hashomer Hatzair Jewish Gen
Meir Ya'ari

1897 births
1987 deaths
People from Przeworsk County
People from the Kingdom of Galicia and Lodomeria
Jews from Galicia (Eastern Europe)
Austro-Hungarian Jews
Austro-Hungarian military personnel of World War I
Austrian emigrants to Mandatory Palestine
Jewish socialists
Israeli communists
Hashomer Hatzair members
Mapam leaders
Alignment (Israel) politicians
Members of the Assembly of Representatives (Mandatory Palestine)
Members of the 1st Knesset (1949–1951)
Members of the 2nd Knesset (1951–1955)
Members of the 3rd Knesset (1955–1959)
Members of the 4th Knesset (1959–1961)
Members of the 5th Knesset (1961–1965)
Members of the 6th Knesset (1965–1969)
Members of the 7th Knesset (1969–1974)
Leaders of the Opposition (Israel)
Jewish Israeli politicians